Regional Justice Center is an American hardcore band from Seattle, Washington. The band is named after a jail in Kent, Washington. The band has released two full-length albums and a handful of EPs. The bands first album, World of Inconvenience, was released in 2018 on Closed Casket Activities. The album was created after fromtman Ian Shelton's experience with an incarcerated family member. The groups second album, Crime and Punishment, was released in 2021 on Closed Casket Activities.

References

American hardcore punk groups